Ramesh Saigal was an Indian film director, producer, screenwriter and actor in Hindi language films.

Professional life
His major work includes Railway Platform (1955), Shola Aur Shabnam (1961) and Ishq Par Zor Nahin (1970).

He was instrumental in giving veteran actor Sunil Dutt a break in the film Railway Platform (1955) when Sunil Dutt was hosting the show, Lipton Ki Mehfil on Radio Ceylon. While covering the Dilip Kumar movie Shikast in 1953, Dutt met director Ramesh Saigal, who impressed by his personality and voice, offered him a role in his upcoming movie. Ramesh Saigal coined the new screen name "Sunil Dutt" for the debutante actor whose real name was Balraj Dutt to avoid name conflicts with the then veteran actor Balraj Sahni.

Filmography

Director

Producer

Screenwriter

References

External links
 

Film producers from Mumbai
Hindi film producers
Hindi-language film directors
Film directors from Mumbai
Indian Hindus
20th-century Indian film directors
Indian male screenwriters
Screenwriters from Mumbai
Hindi screenwriters